Nashville Plantation is a plantation in Aroostook County, Maine, United States. The population was 27 at the 2020 census.

Geography

Demographics

As of the census of 2000, there were 55 people, 22 households, and 15 families living in the plantation. The population density was 1.6 people per square mile (0.6/km2). There were 25 housing units at an average density of 0.7 per square mile (0.3/km2). The racial makeup of the plantation was 100.00% White.

Of the 22 households 36.4% had children under the age of 18 living with them, 54.5% were married couples living together, 13.6% had a female householder with no husband present, and 31.8% were non-families. 27.3% of households were one person and 9.1% were one person aged 65 or older. The average household size was 2.50 and the average family size was 3.13.

The age distribution was 30.9% under the age of 18, 3.6% from 18 to 24, 29.1% from 25 to 44, 21.8% from 45 to 64, and 14.5% 65 or older. The median age was 34 years. For every 100 females, there were 103.7 males. For every 100 females age 18 and over, there were 81.0 males.

The median household income was $36,875 and the median family income  was $41,750. Males had a median income of $51,250 versus $60,833 for females. The per capita income for the plantation was $21,917. There were 13.3% of families and 18.5% of the population living below the poverty line, including 11.8% of under eighteens and 42.9% of those over 64.

References

Plantations in Aroostook County, Maine
Plantations in Maine